This is a list of the number-one hits of 1997 on Italian Hit Parade Singles Chart.

References

1997
One
1997 record charts